A - B - C - D - E - F - G - H - I - J - K - L - M - N - O - P - Q - R - S - T - U - V - W - XYZ

This is a list of rivers in the United States that have names starting with the letter T.  For the main page, which includes links to listings by state, see List of rivers in the United States.

Ta - Tc 
Ta River - Virginia
Tacoosh River - Michigan
Tahquamenon River - Michigan
Taiya River - Alaska
Taku River - Alaska
Talachulitna River - Alaska
Talkeetna River - Alaska
Tallahatchie River - Mississippi
Tallapoosa River - Georgia, Alabama
Tallulah River - North Carolina, Georgia
Tanana River - Alaska
Tangipahoa River - Mississippi, Louisiana
Tar River - North Carolina
Tarbell Brook - New Hampshire, Massachusetts
Taunton River - Massachusetts
Taylor River - New Hampshire
Tazlina River - Alaska
Tchefuncte River - Louisiana
Tchoutacabouffa River - Mississippi

Te 
Teal River - Wisconsin
Teanaway River - Washington
Teklanika River - Alaska
Tellico River - North Carolina, Tennessee
Ten Mile River - Connecticut, New York
Ten Mile River - Massachusetts, Rhode Island
Tenmile Creek - West Virginia
Tennessee River - Tennessee, Alabama, Kentucky
Tensas River - Louisiana
Tensaw River - Alabama
Teton River - Montana
Teton River - Wyoming, Idaho

Th 
Thames River - Connecticut
The Branch - New Hampshire
Thief River - Minnesota
Third River - New Jersey
Thompson River - Montana
Thornapple River - Michigan
Thornapple River - Wisconsin
Thornton Creek - Washington
Three Mile River - Massachusetts
Thunder River - Arizona
Thunder Bay River - Michigan

Ti 
Tiasquam River - Massachusetts
Tickfaw River - Louisiana, Mississippi
Tieton River - Washington
Tiffin River - Michigan, Ohio
Tijuana River - California
Tikchik River - Alaska
Tillamook River - Oregon
Tilton River - Washington
Tinayguk River - Alaska
Tinkers Creek - Ohio
Tlikakila River - Alaska
Tioga River - New Hampshire
Tioga River - Pennsylvania, New York
Tionesta Creek - Pennsylvania
Tioughnioga River - New York
Tippecanoe River - Indiana
Tittabawassee River - Michigan

To 
Tobacco Garden Creek - North Dakota
Toccoa River - Georgia
Togiak River - Alaska
Tohickon Creek - Pennsylvania
Tolt River - Washington
Tomahawk River - Wisconsin
Tombigbee River - Mississippi, Alabama
Tomoka River - Florida
Tomorrow River - Wisconsin
Toms Fork - West Virginia
Toms River - New Jersey
Tonawanda Creek - New York
Tongue River - Montana, Wyoming
Tongue River - North Dakota
Tonto Creek - Arizona
Totagatic River - Wisconsin
Touchet River - Washington
Toussaint River (Ohio) - Ohio
Toutle River - Washington
Town River - Massachusetts
Toxaway River - North Carolina, South Carolina

Tr - Ts 
Trade River - Wisconsin
Tradewater River - Kentucky
Trappe River - Wisconsin
Trask River - Oregon
Trempealeau River - Wisconsin
Trimbelle River - Wisconsin
Trinity River - California
Trinity River - Texas
Trout River - Florida
Trout River - Iowa
Trout River - Wisconsin
Truckee River - California, Nevada
Tsirku River - Alaska

Tu - Ty 
Tualatin River - Oregon
Tubutulik River - Alaska
Tucannon River - Washington
Tuckahoe River - New Jersey
Tuckasegee River - North Carolina
Tug Fork of the Big Sandy River - Virginia, West Virginia, Kentucky
Tugaloo River - Georgia, South Carolina
Tule River - California
Tulpehocken Creek - Pennsylvania
Tuolumne River - California
Turkey River - Iowa
Turkey River - New Hampshire
Turtle River - North Dakota
Turtle River - Wisconsin
Tuscarawas River - Ohio
Tuscumbia River - Mississippi, Tennessee
Tutakoke River - Alaska
Twelvepole Creek - West Virginia
Twisp River - Washington
Two Hearted River - Michigan
Two Medicine River - Montana
Twomile Creek - West Virginia
Tygart Creek - West Virginia
Tygart Valley River - West Virginia
Tygarts Creek - Kentucky
Tyger River - South Carolina
Tyronza River - Arkansas

T